Zygmunt Hanusik (28 February 1945 – 4 March 2021) was a Polish cyclist. He competed in the individual road race at the 1968 Summer Olympics. Hanusik died on 4 March 2021, aged 76.

Major results

1965
 4th Overall Tour de Pologne
1966
 4th Overall Tour de Pologne
1st Stage 10
1967
 1st Stages 7 & 12 Milk Race
 4th Overall Tour de Pologne
1st Stage 5
1968
 6th Overall Peace Race
1st Stage 1
1969
 1st Stage 1 Peace Race
 1st Stage 2 Dookoła Mazowsza
 2nd Overall Tour de Pologne
1st Stages 1 & 4
1970
 1st  Road race, Road Championships
 1st Overall Tour d'Algérie 1
1st Stage 4b
 2nd Overall Tour du Loir-et-Cher
1st Stages 1 (TTT) & 5
 3rd Overall Peace Race
1st Stage 2
1971
 2nd Overall Tour of Bulgaria
1st Stage 8
 2nd Overall Grand Prix d'Annaba
 7th Overall Tour de Pologne
1972
 1st Overall Tour du Loir-et-Cher
 3rd Road race, Road Championships

References

External links

1945 births
2021 deaths
Polish male cyclists
Olympic cyclists of Poland
Cyclists at the 1968 Summer Olympics
People from Tychy
Sportspeople from Silesian Voivodeship